Hakeem Butler (born May 16, 1996) is an American football wide receiver for the St. Louis BattleHawks of the XFL. He played college football at Iowa State, and was drafted by the Arizona Cardinals in the fourth round of the 2019 NFL Draft. He has also been a member of the Carolina Panthers and Philadelphia Eagles.

Early years
Butler was born in Baltimore, Maryland on May 16, 1996. His mother, Sherryl, died from breast cancer when Butler was 16. He has 1 sister and a younger brother. He then moved to Houston, Texas, to live with his aunt and uncle, and his cousins Aaron and Andrew Harrison, former Kentucky basketball stars. Butler attended Travis High School in Fort Bend, Texas. He committed to Iowa State University to play college football, choosing it over schools such as New Mexico and Houston.

College career
After redshirting his first year at Iowa State in 2015, Butler played in 11 games in 2016 and had nine receptions for 134 yards and two touchdowns. As a sophomore in 2017, he had 41 receptions for 697 yards and seven touchdowns. As a junior in 2018, he had 60 receptions for 1,318 yards and nine touchdowns, breaking a school record for single season receiving yards. After the season, Butler decided to forgo his senior year and enter the 2019 NFL Draft.

College statistics

Professional career

Arizona Cardinals
Butler was drafted by the Arizona Cardinals in the fourth round (103rd overall) in the 2019 NFL Draft. He was placed on injured reserve on August 25, 2019, after suffering a broken hand, causing him to miss his entire rookie season.

On September 4, 2020, Butler was waived by the Cardinals.

Carolina Panthers
On September 18, 2020, Butler was signed to the Carolina Panthers practice squad.

Philadelphia Eagles
On September 29, 2020, Butler was signed to the Philadelphia Eagles active roster off the Panthers practice squad and converted to tight end. He was waived on October 31, 2020, and re-signed to the practice squad two days later. He signed a reserve/future contract with the Eagles on January 4, 2021. He was waived on August 23, 2021.

BC Lions 
On February 22, 2022 Hakeem Butler signed with the BC Lions of the Canadian Football League (CFL). He was released on May 23, 2022.

Edmonton Elks 
Butler was signed by the Edmonton Elks of the Canadian Football League (CFL) on July 5, 2022, and placed on the team's practice roster. He was released on August 16, 2022.

St. Louis BattleHawks
On January 1, 2023, Butler was selected by the St. Louis BattleHawks in the fifth round of the 2023 XFL Supplemental Draft.

References

External links
Iowa State Cyclones bio
Arizona Cardinals bio

1996 births
Living people
Players of American football from Baltimore
American football wide receivers
Iowa State Cyclones football players
Arizona Cardinals players
Carolina Panthers players
Philadelphia Eagles players
BC Lions players
Edmonton Elks players
St. Louis BattleHawks players